The Negrito peoples of the Philippines speak various Philippine languages. They have more in common with neighboring languages than with each other, and are listed here merely as an aid to identification.

Classification
The following languages are grouped according to their geographic location, and not genetic classification.

Lobel (2013)
Lobel (2013) lists the following Black Filipino (i.e., Philippine Negrito) ethnolinguistic groups.

Northern Luzon
Umiray Dumaget
Remontado Dumagat
Alta, Northern
Alta, Southern
Arta
Casiguran Agta
Nagtipunan Agta
Dinapigue Agta
Central Cagayan Agta
Pahanan (Agta)
Dupaningan Agta
Atta (3-4 languages)

(Lobel (2010) lists the following Negrito languages that are spoken on the eastern coast of Luzon Island, listed from north to south.)

Dupaningan Agta (Northern Luzon branch)
Pahanan Agta
Casiguran Agta
Umiray Dumaget
Remontado Dumagat
Inagta Alabat
Manide
Inagta Partido
Inagta Rinconada

Furthermore, Robinson & Lobel (2013) argue that Dupaningan Agta, Pahanan Agta, Casiguran Agta, Nagtipunan Agta, Dinapigue Agta, and Paranan do not belong to the Northern Cordilleran branch, but rather a new branch that they call Northeastern Luzon, which they consider to be a primary branch of the Northern Luzon (Cordilleran) group.

Zambales Mountains
Ayta Mag-indi
Ayta Mag-anchi
Ayta Abellen
Ayta Ambala
Ayta Bataan ( Ayta Magbukun)

Southern Luzon
Inagta Rinconada
Inagta Partido
Manide
Inagta Alabat (and Inagta Lopez)

Southern Philippines
Inata (possibly 2 dialects)
Inati (Inete) (2 dialects?)
Mamanwa
Batak (5-8 dialects)
Iraya (Mangyan)
Ata/Tigwa/Matigsalug Manobo

Extinct varieties
Mount Iraya Agta (a.k.a. East Lake Buhi Agta)
Dicamay Agta: spoken on the Dicamay River on the western side of the Sierra Madre near Jones, Isabela; reportedly exterminated by Ilokano homesteaders sometime between 1957 and 1974 (Headland 2003:7)
Villa Viciosa Agta

Another Negrito language investigated by Lobel (2013) is Southern Binukidnon (Magahat).

Ethnologue adds the extinct and unclassified Katabaga of Catanauan, Quezon, southern Luzon. The language was originally listed by Garvan (1963: 8). Katabaga is in fact a misspelling of Katabangan, the name that the people use to refer to themselves. Some people in the Bikol Region also use the term Katabangan to refer to mixed-blood Agta in the region. Lobel (2013: 92) reports from a 2006 visit that the Katabangan speak only Tagalog. According to Lobel (2013), if the Katabangan did in fact speak one of the Philippine Negrito languages before, it would have been related to Agta of the Lopez-Guinayangan area (see Inagta Alabat language) or to Manide based on its present-day location.

Louward Allen Zubiri reports that there are 670 individuals in the Katabangan community. There are also families living in Mulanay, Gumaca, Lopez, and Alabat.

Reid (1994)
Reid (1994) lists the following Negrito languages.
North Agta
Northern Cagayan
Central Cagayan
Eastern Cagayan
Southern Cagayan
Southern Isabela
Aurora
Arta - 12 remaining speakers in Aglipay, Quirino, in 1990
Alta
North Alta - spoken in Aurora Province
South Alta (Kabuluen) - spoken in Nueva Ecija and Bulacan Provinces
Central Agta - spoken in eastern Luzon; includes Umiray
South Agta
Camarines Norte
Camarines Sur
Sinauna
Ayta - 6 different languages spoken in the Zambales Mountains according to Wimbel (1986):
Abelen
Aberlen
Magganchi
Maggindi
Ambala
Magbeken Ayta

Other Philippine Negrito languages
Ata Manobo - spoken in Mansalinao, Davao
Batak - spoken in Palawan
Inati
Mamanwa - spoken in Agusan

Reid (2013)
Reid (2013) considers the Philippine Negrito languages (highlighted in bold) to have split in the following fashion. Reid (2013) considers each Negrito language or group to be a first-order split in its respective branch, with Inati and Manide–Alabat as first-order subgroups of Malayo-Polynesian.

Malayo-Polynesian (MP)
diverse MP branches outside of the Philippines
Bashiic, Kalamianic and other MP branches on the Philippines not comprising Negrito languages
Manide–Alabat
Inati
Northern Luzon languages
Arta
Umiray Dumaget (?)
Northeastern Luzon languages
Cagayan Valley languages
Ilokano
Meso-Cordilleran languages
North Alta
South Alta
South Cordilleran languages
Central Cordilleran languages
Central Luzon languages
Remontado Dumagat (Sinauna Tagalog)
Kapampangan
Sambalic languages
Ayta languages
Sambal languages
Central Philippine languages
Mamanwa
Tagalog
Bikol
Bisayan
Mansaka

Unique vocabulary
Lobel (2010) lists the following percentage of unique vocabulary items out of 1,000 compared words in these Negrito languages, which Reid (1994) suggests are lexical remnants from the pre-Austronesian substrata that these Negrito languages may have. Manide and Umiray Dumaget have the most unique vocabulary items.
Manide: 28.5%
Umiray Dumaget: 23%
Inate: 9%
Mamanwa: 7%
Batak: 1%
Inagta Rinconada; Inagta Partido: 2%

Other Southeast Asian languages with high proportions of unique vocabulary of possible isolate origin include the Enggano language of Indonesia and the Kenaboi language of Malaysia.

Reid (1994)
Reid (1994) lists the following reconstructed forms as possible non-Austronesian lexical elements in Philippine Negrito languages.

Reid (2013: 334) considers the endonym *ʔa(R)ta, meaning 'person', to have been a native Negrito word that was later borrowed into Austronesian with the meaning 'dark-skinned person'.

References

Fay Wouk and Malcolm Ross (ed.), The history and typology of western Austronesian voice systems. Australian National University, 2002.
K. Alexander Adelaar and Nikolaus Himmelmann, The Austronesian languages of Asia and Madagascar. Routledge, 2005.
Austronesian Basic Vocabulary Database, 2008.
Reid, Lawrence A. (2013) "Who Are the Philippine Negritos? Evidence from Language." Human Biology: Vol. 85: Iss. 1, Article 15.

External links
Comparative vocabularies of Philippine and other Austronesian languages
Cognate sets for Austronesian languages

Aeta languages

 01
Negritos